"Seven Seas Symphony" is an instrumental composed by Barry, Robin & Maurice Gibb, released on the Bee Gees album Odessa in March 1969.

Recording
This song was originally recorded on August 19, 1968, at Atlantic Studios in New York City and was completed in November at IBC Studios in London. Its demo version was released in 2009 on the Sketches for Odessa disc with the remastered edition of the album. On the demo, a piano played by Maurice was heard. On the originally released version Maurice's piano was heard again along with Bill Shepherd's orchestra – aside from this, the Bee Gees band did not participate on this track or the other instrumental tracks on the album.

Personnel
 Maurice Gibb – piano
 Bill Shepherd – orchestral arrangement
 P Sharp — sound engineer
 Philip Wade – sound engineer

References

1969 songs
Instrumentals
Bee Gees songs
Songs written by Barry Gibb
Songs written by Robin Gibb
Songs written by Maurice Gibb
Song recordings produced by Robert Stigwood
Song recordings produced by Barry Gibb
Song recordings produced by Robin Gibb
Song recordings produced by Maurice Gibb